First Interstate Bank may refer to:

First Interstate Bancorp of Los Angeles, California, which merged with Wells Fargo in 1996
Several buildings formerly named for the bank, now known as
Aon Center (Los Angeles), California
a fire in this building on May 4, 1988 may be referred to as the First Interstate Tower fire
Fountain Place, Dallas, Texas
Library Tower, Los Angeles, CA
Wells Fargo Plaza (Houston), Texas
Wells Fargo Center (Portland, Oregon)
Wells Fargo Center (Seattle), Seattle, Washington
 First Interstate BancSystem, Billings, Montana bank since 1984

See also
 First Bank (disambiguation)
 First Interstate Bank Center, Redmond, Oregon